The 2017 season of the Tonga Major League is the 38th season of top flight association football competition in Tonga. A total of seven teams compete in the league. The winner qualifies for the 2018 OFC Champions League Qualifying stage. Because the Tonga Major League is the only men's senior competition on Tonga there is no relegation.

The league was won by Veitongo and they qualified for the 2018 OFC Champions League.

Clubs
'Ikale Kolomotu'a
Ha'amoko United Youth
Lotoha'apai United
Marist Kauvai
Marist Prems
Navutoka
Veitongo

Standings
Incomplete table:

References

Tonga Major League seasons
Tonga
Football